Francis Collins is an Irish retired hurler who played as a midfielder for the Cork senior team.

Born in Castlehaven, County Cork, Collins first played competitive Gaelic games during his schooling at the St. Finbarr's College. He arrived on the inter-county scene when he first linked up with the Cork senior team. He made his debut during the 1982 championship. Collins quickly became a regular member of the starting fifteen. He was an All-Ireland runner-up on two occasions.

At club level Collins is a one-time Munster medallist as a Gaelic footballer with Castlehaven. In addition to this he is also a dual championship medallist having played hurling with Blackrock.

Collin's brothers, Donie and Christy, also played with Cork.

Throughout his career Collins made 4 championship appearances. His retirement came following the conclusion of the 1983 championship.

Honours

Player

Blackrock
Cork Senior Club Hurling Championship (1): 1985

Castlehaven
Munster Senior Club Football Championship (1): 1989
Cork Senior Club Football Championship (1): 1989

Cork
Munster Senior Hurling Championship (2): 1982 (sub), 1983 (sub)

References

Living people
Dual players
Blackrock National Hurling Club hurlers
Castlehaven Gaelic footballers
Cork inter-county hurlers
Year of birth missing (living people)